P'yŏngwŏn County is a kun (county) in South P'yŏngan province, North Korea.

Administrative divisions
P'yŏngwŏn County is divided into 1 ŭp (town), 2 rodongjagu (workers' districts) and 29 ri (villages):

Transportation
P'yŏngwŏn County is served by the P'yŏngŭi Line of the Korean State Railway.

References

External links
  Map of Pyongan provinces
  Detailed map

Counties of South Pyongan